The following is a list of characters that first appeared in the British soap opera EastEnders in 2023, by order of first appearance. All characters are introduced by the show's senior executive producer, Kate Oates, and the executive producer, Chris Clenshaw. The first character to be introduced is Brett Nelson (Fabrizio Santino), a man from Zack Hudson's (James Farrar) past; he debuts in January. Emma Harding (Patsy Kensit), the estranged mother of Lola Pearce (Danielle Harold), and Jed (Bradley Jaden), a lodger for Sonia Fowler (Natalie Cassidy), also first appear in January. Jo Cotton (Vicki Michelle), the estranged wife of Tom "Rocky" Cotton (Brian Conley), will be introduced for a guest stint later in the year. Additionally, multiple other characters were featured during the year.

Brett Nelson 

Brett Nelson, played by Fabrizio Santino, first appears in episode 6625, originally broadcast on 9 January 2023. The character and Santino's casting details were announced on 29 December 2022. Brett is introduced as someone from Zack Hudson's (James Farrar) past. He is described as "enigmatic". Producers used the characters of Brett and Zack to explore the issue of HIV and worked with the charity Terrence Higgins Trust to develop the story. Having previously tackled the issue in the 1990s using the character of Mark Fowler (Todd Carty), EastEnders aims to highlight the developments in HIV research in the last 30 years. The shared backstory between Brett and Zack states that the latter contracted HIV from Brett after they shared needles from steroid injections.

Emma Harding 

Emma Harding, played by Patsy Kensit, first appears in episode 6635, originally broadcast on 25 January 2023. The character and Kensit's casting details were first reported on 5 November 2022, with further details announced on 20 December 2022. Emma is introduced as the estranged mother of established character Lola Pearce (Danielle Harold), who is terminally ill with a brain tumour. Kensit was contracted for a “short stint” and began filming in November 2022. Chris Clenshaw, the show's executive producer, thought Emma shared some similarities with Lola, including "a striking resemblance; successful, the capacity to hold her own [...] and she's a fighter". He noted that Emma is also "softly spoken and measured", unlike Lola.

The character's backstory states that she left Lola and her father, Dan, when Lola was three years old. Clenshaw explained that Emma wants to reconcile with her daughter, having felt guilty since she left. Kensit expressed her joy at appearing in the soap and praised the show's cast and production team. Clenshaw called Kensit the "perfect fit" for the character of Emma, who he described as "a long-awaited character that we know very little about". He added, "Patsy's portrayal is bound to set off fireworks in Walford and cause havoc for the Mitchell household."

Jed 

Jed, played by Bradley Jaden, first appears in episode 6638, originally broadcast on 31 January 2023. The character and Jaden's casting details were announced on 24 January 2023. Jed is introduced as a lodger for Sonia Fowler (Natalie Cassidy) at number 25 Albert Square. He is billed as a "free spirit" who charms Sonia. Lewis Knight from the Radio Times suggested that Jed may be involved in a love triangle with Sonia and Reiss Colwell (Jonny Freeman). The character departs in episode 6644, originally broadcast on 10 February 2023, when he is evicted.

Jo Cotton 

Jo Cotton, played by Vicki Michelle, first appears in 2023. Michelle's casting in the soap was reported on 4 February 2023. Details about her character were announced by executive producer Chris Clenshaw during an interview on Loose Women on 24 February 2023. The character had been referenced in episode 6596, first broadcast on 23 November 2022. Jo is introduced as the estranged wife of established character Tom "Rocky" Cotton (Brian Conley), who is engaged to Kathy Beale (Gillian Taylforth). Michelle was contracted to appear in two episodes and began filming in February. Jo is characterised as "brash, quick-witted, and extremely glamorous" by Clenshaw.

The character's backstory states that Jo and Rocky have been married for 25 years. Producers kept most details about the backstory embargoed. Michelle expressed her delight at the character and story. Clenshaw was delighted to welcome Michelle to the cast and deemed her the "perfect fit to take on the elusive character of Rocky's wife". He praised the scenes between Jo, Rocky and Kathy, calling them "brilliant".

Other characters

References 

2023
, EastEnders
EastEnders